Dimitar Botyov Dimitrov (born 6 January 1990) is a Bulgarian footballer, who currently plays as a forward for Germanea.

References

External links
 

1990 births
Living people
Bulgarian footballers
First Professional Football League (Bulgaria) players
FC Pirin Razlog players
PFC Marek Dupnitsa players
FC Oborishte players
Association football forwards
People from Dupnitsa
Sportspeople from Kyustendil Province